Cazeresia is a genus of leaf beetles in the subfamily Eumolpinae. It contains only one species, Cazeresia montana, found at 1,450 m and above on Mount Humboldt in the South Province of New Caledonia. Adults of C. montana were found on Dracophyllum involucratum, a species of plant in the family Epacridaceae. According to Jolivet et al. (2005), most probably the larvae feed on the roots of this plant. The genus is named after Sylvie Cazères, an assistant to the Pocquereux entomological group from the Institut Agronomique néo-Calédonien. Sylvie Cazères collected specimens of C. montana and other species of leaf beetles.

References

Eumolpinae
Insects of New Caledonia
Monotypic Chrysomelidae genera
Beetles of Oceania
Endemic fauna of New Caledonia